The Kurow River is a river of North Otago, New Zealand. A tributary of the Waitaki River, it rises in Saint Marys Range and flows into that river downstream of Kurow.

See also
List of rivers of New Zealand

References

Rivers of Otago
Rivers of New Zealand